Running Water is a 1922 British silent drama film directed by Maurice Elvey and starring Madge Stuart, Lawford Davidson and Julian Royce. The film is an adaptation of A.E.W. Mason's 1906 novel Running Water.

Cast
 Madge Stuart as Sylvia Skinner  
 Lawford Davidson as Capt. Hilary Cheyne  
 Julian Royce as Garrett Skinner  
 A. Bromley Davenport as Capt. Barstow  
 Irene Rooke as Mrs. Thesiger  
 George Turner as Wallie Hine  
 E. Lewis Waller as Archie Parminter  
 George Harrington as Michel

References

Bibliography
 Low, Rachael. History of the British Film, 1918-1929. George Allen & Unwin, 1971.

External links

1922 films
1922 drama films
British silent feature films
British drama films
1920s English-language films
Films directed by Maurice Elvey
Stoll Pictures films
Films shot at Cricklewood Studios
Films based on British novels
British black-and-white films
1920s British films
Silent drama films